Scott Andrew Mink (October 13, 1963 – July 20, 2004) was executed by the State of Ohio. A drug addict and alcoholic, he had been sentenced to die on June 29, 2001, for beating his 79-year-old father and 72-year-old mother to death with a hammer.

Mink had previously served six months in jail for theft.

The crimes occurred on September 19, 2000, when Mink, angry with his parents because they hid his car keys to prevent him from leaving the house to buy drugs and alcohol, attacked William and Sheila Mink while they slept in their rural Montgomery County home.

Enraged at being thwarted in his quest to get high, Mink beat his sleeping parents with a claw hammer until the head broke. He then battered them with cutting boards until those shattered. Finally, he repeatedly stabbed his parents with kitchen knives and strangled his mother with an electrical cord. Mink then stole his parents' credit cards and sold their belongings to purchase crack cocaine. He later confessed the brutal slayings to police.

He pleaded guilty before a panel of three judges and asked for a death sentence, which the judges handed down. Under Ohio law, all death sentences are automatically reviewed by an appellate court regardless of the inmate's desire to appeal. After his conviction was upheld by the Ohio Supreme Court on direct appeal in April 2004, Mink dropped his efforts to fight his sentence.

Mink spent 1,118 days (i.e., 3 years and 23 days) on death row before being executed by lethal injection – the second-shortest time, aside from Rocky Barton, since Ohio began executing criminals in 1999.

See also 
 Capital punishment in Ohio
 Capital punishment in the United States
 List of people executed in Ohio
 List of people executed in the United States in 2004

General references 
 Clark Prosecutor
 2005 Capital Crimes Report, Ohio Attorney General's Office  (PDF)

References

External links 
 The High Price of Crack from The Malefactor's Register

1963 births
2004 deaths
21st-century executions by Ohio
21st-century executions of American people
American people executed for murder
Executed people from Ohio
Parricides
People executed by Ohio by lethal injection
People convicted of murder by Ohio
People from Dayton, Ohio